Through the Fire may refer to:

Music
Through the Fire (Hagar Schon Aaronson Shrieve album), a 1984 album by HSAS
"Through the Fire" (song), a 1985 song by Chaka Khan
"Through the Fire", a 2022 song by Fivio Foreign featuring Quavo from the album B.I.B.L.E.

Film
Through the Fire (1988 film), a supernatural horror film, also released as Gates of Hell II: Dead Awakening
Through the Fire (2012 film), documentary film about Somali women

See also
 "Through the Fire and Flames", a 2005 DragonForce song
 Through Fire, an American hard rock band